The 64th FAMAS Awards were presented December 4, 2016 at the Century Park Hotel in Malate, Manila honoring the outstanding achievements in Filipino films of 2015.

Winners and nominees
Winners are listed first, highlighted in boldface and indicated with a double dagger. 

{| class=wikitable
|-
! style="background:#EEDD82; width:50%" | Best Picture
! style="background:#EEDD82; width:50%" | Best Director
|-
| valign="top" |
 Felix Manalo — Viva Films The Love Affair — Malou N. Santos for Star Cinema 
 A Second Chance — Malou N. Santos for Star Cinema
 Angela Markado — Oro De Siete Films, Viva Films
 Ari: My Life with a King — CMB Studios
 Crazy Beautiful You — Malou N Santos for Star Cinema
 Para sa Hopeless Romantic — Film Development Council of the Philippines and BG Productions International
 Silong — Film Laboratories Inc. and Black Maria Pictures
| valign="top" |
 Joel Lamangan — Felix Manalo
 Andoy Ranay — Para sa Hopeless Romantic
 Antoinette Jadaone — You're My Boss
 Carlo Encisco Catu — Ari: My Life with A King
 Carlo J. Caparas — Angela Markado
 Cathy Garcia-Molina — A Second Chance
 Mae Czarina Cruz-Alviar — Crazy Beautiful You
 Nuel C. Naval — The Love Affair
 Roy Sevilla Ho, Jeffrey Hidalgo — Silong
 Tikoy Aguiluz — Tragic Theater
|-
! style="background:#EEDD82; width:50%" | Best Actor
! style="background:#EEDD82; width:50%" | Best Actress
|-
| valign="top" |
 Dennis Trillo — Felix Manalo as Felix Manalo
 Coco Martin — You're My Boss as Pong Dalupan
 Daniel Padilla — Crazy Beautiful You as Kiko Alcantara
 Francisco Guinto — Ari: My Life With A King as Conrado 'Kong Dado' Guinto
 James Reid — Para sa Hopeless Romantic as Nikko
 John Estrada — Tragic Theater as Fr. Nilo Marcelo
 John Lloyd Cruz — A Second Chance as Popoy
 Paolo Contis — Angela Markado as Gang Leader rapist
 Piolo Pascual — Silong as Dr. Miguel Cascarro
 Richard Gomez — The Love Affair as Vince Ramos
| valign="top" |
 Andi Eigenmann — Angela Markado as Angela Markado
 Andi Eigenmann — Tragic Theater as Annie Francisco
 Bea Alonzo — The Love Affair as Atty. Adrianne "Adie" Valiente
 Bea Alonzo — A Second Chance as Basha-Belinda Eugenio Gonzales
 Bela Padilla — Felix Manalo as Honorata "Ata" de Guzmán-Manalo
 Dawn Zulueta — The Love Affair as Patricia "Trisha" Ramos
 Kathryn Bernardo — Crazy Beautiful You as Jacqueline "Jackie" Serrano
 Nadine Lustre — Para sa Hopeless Romantic as Rebecca "Becca" Del Mundo
 Rhian Ramos — Silong as Valerie
 Toni Gonzaga — You're My Boss as Georgina Lorenzana 
|-
! style="background:#EEDD82; width:50%" | Best Supporting Actor
! style="background:#EEDD82; width:50%" | Best Supporting Actress
|-
| valign="top" |
 Gabby Concepcion — Crazy Beautiful You as Mayor Ito Alcantara
 Christopher de Leon — Tragic Theater as Miguel Sanchez Agcaoli
 Jeffrey Quizon — Angela Markado as Gang Member rapist
 Freddie Webb — You're My Boss as Sir Albert
 Guji Lorenzana — Silong as Gilbert
 Iñigo Pascual  — Para sa Hopeless Romantic as Ryan Sebastian
 Ketchup Eusebio   — Heneral Luna as Pedro Janolino
 Ronwaldo Martin — Ari: My Life With A King as Jaypee
| valign="top" |
 Lorna Tolentino — Crazy Beautiful You as Dra. Leah Serrano
 Angel Jacob — Silong as Caroline
 Bea Saw — A Second Chance as Angeline "Anj" Tan
 Cecile Yumul — Ari: My Life With A King as Miding
 Julia Barretto — Para sa Hopeless Romantic as Maria Kristina Lapuz
 Roxanne Barcelo — Tragic Theater as Arlene de Lara
 Ysabelle Peach — Angela Markado as Digna 
|-
! style="background:#EEDD82; width:50%" | Best Child Performer
! style="background:#EEDD82; width:50%" | Best Screenplay
|-
| valign="top" |
 JM Ibañez — Crazy Beautiful You as Tintoy
 Carl Acosta — Felix Manalo as young Felix Manalo
 Sam Shoaf — Silong as Miguel
| valign="top" |
 'Bienvenido Santiago — Felix Manalo
 Antoinette Jadaone and Yoshke Dimen — You're My Boss
 Carlo J. Caparas — Tragic Theater
 Carmi G. Raymundo, Vanessa R. Valdez and Cathy Garcia-Molina — A Second Chance
 G.M. Coronel — Tragic Theater
 Maan Dimaculangan, John Christian Nicolas, Bianca B. Bernardino and Carmi Raymundo — Crazy Beautiful You
 Mel Mendoza-Del Rosario and Mary Rose Colindres — Para sa Hopeless Romantic
 Robby Tantingco — Ari: My Life With A King
 Roy Sevilla Ho — Silong
 Vanessa R. Valdez — The Love Affair
|-
! style="background:#EEDD82; width:50%" | Best Cinematography
! style="background:#EEDD82; width:50%" | Best Production Design
|-
| valign="top" |
 Rain Yamson — Silong
 Anne Monzon — The Love Affair
 Boy Yniquez — Tragic Theater 
 Carlo Mendoza — Ari: My Life With A King
 Dan Villegas and Moises Lee — Crazy Beautiful You
 Erwin Cruz — Angela Markado
 Herman Claravall — You're My Boss
 Noel Teehankee — A Second Chance
 Pao Orendain — Para sa Hopeless Romantic
 Rody Lacap — Felix Manalo
| valign="top" |
 Shari Marie Montiague — You're My Boss
 Efren Vibar — The Love Affair
 Gerry Borreros — A Second Chance 
 Gwyn Guanzon and Riza Romero — Para sa Hopeless Romantic
 Joel Bilbao, Edgar Martin Littaua and Daniel Red — Felix Manalo
 Joy Abadeza — Angela Markado
 Roland Rebunecia — Silong
 Roma Regala and Richard Somes — Tragic Theater
 Winston Acuyong — Crazy Beautiful You

|-
! style="background:#EEDD82; width:50%" | Best Editing
! style="background:#EEDD82; width:50%" | Best Story
|-
| valign="top" |
 Carlo Francisco Manatad — Para sa Hopeless Romantic
 Bebs Gohetia — Angela Markado Beng Bandong — The Love Affair Carlo Francisco Manatad — Ari: My Life With A King John Anthony L. Wong — Felix Manalo Marya Ignacio — A Second Chance Marya Ignacio — Crazy Beautiful You Marya Ignacio — You're My Boss Rolando Eucasion and Mirana Medina-Bhunjun — Tragic Theater Sarah Roxas — Silong| valign="top" |
 Robby Tantingco  — Ari: My Life With A King
 Antoinette Jadaone and Yoshke Dimen  — You're My Boss Bienvenido Santiago — Felix Manalo Carlo J. Caparas — Angela Markado Carmi G. Raymundo, Vanessa R. Valdez and Cathy Garcia-Molina — A Second Chance G.M. Coronel — Tragic Theater Marcelo Santos III — Para sa Hopeless Romantic Rory B. Quintos — Crazy Beautiful You Roy Sevilla Ho — Silong Vanessa R. Valdez — The Love Affair|-
! style="background:#EEDD82; width:50%" | Best Sound
! style="background:#EEDD82; width:50%" | Best Musical Score
|-
| valign="top" |
 Addiss Tabong — You're My Boss
 Albert Michael Idioma — Felix Manalo Albert Michael Idioma — Tragic Theater Arnel M. Labayo — Crazy Beautiful You Aurel Claro Bilbao — A Second Chance Aurel Claro Bilbao — The Love Affair Gilbert Obispo — Ari: My Life With A King Jess Carlos — Silong Junel Valencia — Angela Markado Lamberto Casas Jr. — Para sa Hopeless Romantic| valign="top" |
 Cesar Francis Concio — The Love Affair
 Cesar Francis Concio — A Second Chance Emerson Texon — Angela Markado Emerson Texon — You're My Boss Emerson Texon — Tragic Theater Jake Abello — Ari: My Life With A King Jesse Lucas — Crazy Beautiful You Myke Solomon — Para sa Hopeless Romantic Teresa Barrozo — Silong Von de Guzman — Felix Manalo|-
! style="background:#EEDD82; width:50%" | Best Theme Song
! style="background:#EEDD82; width:50%" | Best Visual Effects
|-
| valign="top" |
 "Ang Sugo ng Diyos sa mga Huling Araw" from Felix Manalo — Music by Sonic State Audio; Lyrics by Abra 
 "I'll Never Go" from A Second Chance — music and lyrics by Nexxus 
 "Your Love" from The Love Affair — music and lyrics by Alamid
 "Baby I Need Your Loving" from You're My Boss — music and lyrics by Four Tops
 "Ikaw" from Para sa Hopeless Romantic —  music and lyrics by Yeng Constantino
 "Nothing's Gonna Stop Us Now" from Crazy Beautiful You —  music and lyrics by Albert Hammond and Diane Warren
 "With Whom" from Silong —  music and lyrics by Kitchie Nadal
| valign="top" |
 Angela Markado — Vincent Ilagan and Mike Velasquez
 Felix Manalo — Adrian Arcega
 A Second Chance — Aileen Girlie Mercado
 Para sa Hopeless Romantic — OJ Desuasido
 Tragic Theater'' — Dodge Ledesma
|-
|}

Special AwardsFAMAS Lifetime Achievement AwardGloria SevillaPresidential AwardVilma SantosGerman Moreno Youth Achievement AwardJak Roberto
Sanya Lopez
Gabbi GarciaFernando Poe Jr. Memorial AwardRobin PadillaArt M. Padua Memorial AwardDanny DolorDr. Jose Perez Memorial AwardJojo GabineteRecognition Award for Outstanding PerformanceArnold Reyes2016 Advocacy FilmEDSAFather of Visual PoetryDoc Penpen B. TakipsilimSpecial CitationPersida Acosta (for championing the cause of eliminating violence against women)Posthumous AwardGerman MorenoFront Row Stars of the NightPiolo Pascual
Lorna TolentinoFinesse Look of the NightRobi Domingo
Jean GarciaBest New Female ArtistYsabelle PeachActor Par ExcellencePiolo PascualDirector Par ExcellenceCarlo J. CaparasScreenplay Par Excellence'''
Carlo J. Caparas

References

External links
FAMAS Awards 

FAMAS Award
FAM
FAM